Shuru or Showarow or Shooroo may refer to:
 Shuru, Hormozgan
 Shuru, Kerman
 Shuru, Sistan and Baluchestan
 Showarow, South Khorasan
 Shuru Rural District, in Sistan and Baluchestan Province